The 2020 United States Senate election in Colorado was held on November 3, 2020, to elect a member of the United States Senate to represent the State of Colorado, concurrently with the 2020 U.S. presidential election, as well as other elections to the United States Senate, elections to the United States House of Representatives and various state and local elections.

Under Colorado law, the filing deadline for U.S. Senate candidates was March 17, 2020, the third Tuesday in March of the election year; the primary election occurred on June 30. Incumbent Republican Senator Cory Gardner ran for reelection to a second term but was defeated by former Democratic Governor John Hickenlooper in the general election. Gardner was unopposed in the Republican primary, and Hickenlooper defeated former State House Speaker Andrew Romanoff in the Democratic primary.

Gardner was one of two Republican U.S. senators facing reelection in 2020 in a state President Donald Trump lost in 2016, the other being Susan Collins of Maine. Many pollsters and pundits  considered Gardner to be the most vulnerable Republican Senator facing re-election in 2020 due to his narrow victory in 2014, the state's leftward shift, and Trump's unpopularity in the state. As predicted, Democratic challenger, John Hickenlooper easily defeated Gardner by a 9.3-point margin. However, Gardner did manage to outperform Donald Trump in the concurrent presidential election by roughly four points. This became the first election Gardner had lost in his political career. This is also the second consecutive election in which the incumbent senator lost re-election to a second term for this particular seat. At the age of 68, Hickenlooper is the oldest first term Senator in Colorado.

Background
Gardner was elected to the U.S. Senate in 2014, narrowly defeating incumbent Democratic Senator Mark Udall in a very successful election year for Republicans. Gardner was widely considered vulnerable in 2020 due to Colorado's recent Democratic trend and his support for Trump. Gardner also faced a four year grassroots campaign across the state by progressive political activists to hold him accountable for his votes, featured a cardboard cutout dubbed "Cardboard Cory". The seat was expected to be highly competitive and the most likely Republican-held seat to flip Democratic. The Democratic nominee, former governor John Hickenlooper, had a double-digit lead over Gardner in the polls.

Various minor scandals in the days leading up to the June 30 Democratic primary sparked speculation that Romanoff might win, but Hickenlooper had an advantage in name recognition, and harsh negative attacks by Romanoff reportedly led many state Democrats and voters to sour on him.

Republican primary

Candidates

Nominee
 Cory Gardner, incumbent U.S. Senator

Withdrawn
 Margot Dupre, estate agent
 Gail Prentice, veteran and business owner

Endorsements

Results

Democratic primary

Candidates

Nominee
John Hickenlooper, former Governor of Colorado and former candidate for President of the United States in 2020

Eliminated in primary
Andrew Romanoff, former Speaker of the Colorado House of Representatives, candidate for U.S. Senate in 2010, and nominee for Colorado's 6th congressional district in 2014

Withdrawn
Dan Baer, former executive director of the Colorado Department of Higher Education and former United States Ambassador to the Organization for Security and Cooperation in Europe (endorsed John Hickenlooper)
Derrick Blanton
Marcos Boyington, software engineer
Diana Bray, psychologist and climate activist(endorsed Andrew Romanoff)
Denise Burgess, businesswoman and Denver Metro Chamber of Commerce board member
Ellen Burnes, Colorado State University professor and former chair of the Boulder County Democratic Party
Lorena Garcia, community organizer
David Goldfischer, associate professor at the Korbel School for International Studies at the University of Denver and national security advisor
Mike Johnston, former state senator and candidate for Governor of Colorado in 2018
Danielle Kombo, medical recruiter and businesswoman(endorsed Stephany Rose Spaulding)
Dustin Leitzel, pharmacist
Alice Madden, former majority leader of the Colorado House of Representatives
Christopher Hawkins Critter Milton, 2020 Unity Party nominee for Colorado's 3rd congressional district
Keith Pottratz, technician and veteran(endorsed Lorena Garcia)
Stephany Rose Spaulding, professor at University of Colorado Colorado Springs and nominee for Colorado's 5th congressional district in 2018 (endorsed Lorena Garcia)
Erik Underwood, entrepreneur and candidate for Governor of Colorado in 2018
John F. Walsh, former U.S. Attorney for the District of Colorado(endorsed John Hickenlooper)
Michelle Ferrigno Warren, nonprofit leader, immigration advocate, first time candidate
Angela Williams, state senator (ran for re-election)
Trish Zornio, biomedical scientist (endorsed John Hickenlooper)

Declined
Diana DeGette, incumbent U.S. Representative (ran for re-election)
Crisanta Duran, former speaker of the Colorado House of Representatives (ran for Colorado's 1st congressional district, then withdrew)
Jena Griswold, Colorado Secretary of State
Cary Kennedy, former Colorado State Treasurer
Joe Neguse, incumbent U.S. Representative for Colorado's 2nd congressional district (ran for re-election)
Ed Perlmutter, incumbent U.S. Representative for Colorado's 7th congressional district (endorsed John Hickenlooper)
Joe Salazar, former state representative
Kerry Donovan, state senator (endorsed John Hickenlooper)

Endorsements

Polling

with Dan Baer and John Hickenlooper

with John Hickenlooper and Mike Johnston

with John Hickenlooper and Alice Madden

with John Hickenlooper and Angela Williams

Caucus
On March 7, 2020, the Colorado Democratic Party held a non-binding Senate primary preference poll at its caucus sites. Attendees could choose delegates to county and then state conventions. If a candidate received at least 30% of the delegates at the state convention they would be placed on the ballot. Some candidates were not listed because they instead chose to attempt to collect signatures to reach the ballot. Candidates needed 1,500 signatures from each congressional district. Hickenlooper and Underwood chose to do both. Romanoff collected the needed signatures as of March 8, 2020.

Caucus results
Romanoff was the only candidate to get more than 30% in the initial precinct caucuses. Hickenlooper withdrew from the assembly process soon afterward, choosing to qualify for the ballot exclusively by petition. Ballot access for assembly candidates will be decided at the state assembly. Caucus winners do not always receive the party's nomination; Romanoff won them in the 2010 Democratic primary for Colorado's Senate race, but Michael Bennet won the party's nomination that year.

The aggregate results of the various precinct caucuses on March 7, 2020, were:

Results

Other candidates

Libertarian primary

Nominee
Raymon Doane, Libertarian nominee for Colorado's 1st congressional district in 2018

Eliminated in primary
Gaylon Kent, author and perennial candidate

Results

Unity Party

Nominee
Stephan "Chairman Seku" Evans, former candidate for Mayor of Denver

Eliminated at Unity Party convention
Joshua Rodriguez

Withdrawn
Gary Swing, perennial candidate

Write-in candidates

Declared
Dan Doyle (Approval Voting Party)
Michael Sanchez (Independent)
Danny Skelly, Small Business Owner (Independent)
Bruce Lohmiller (Green Party)
Theodore Rockwell, Steamboat Springs, (Independent)

Withdrawn
Veronique Bellamy, former candidate for RTD board (Socialist Party) 
Joseph "Joey" Camp, performance artist (Independent)
Lisa Garcia (Independent)
Christopher K. Springer (Independent)
Donald George Willoughby (Independent)
Marti Wolf (Independent)

General election

Debate

Predictions

Endorsements

Polling

Graphical Summary

Poll Results 

with generic Democrat

on whether Cory Gardner deserves to be re-elected

with Generic Republican and Generic Democrat

with Mike Johnston

Results 
The election was not particularly close, with Hickenlooper winning by 9.32%. Hickenlooper's win was expected, as Colorado has moved more toward being a blue state. Key to Hickenlooper's victory was Denver County and its surrounding suburban counties, Adams, Arapahoe, Boulder, and Jefferson, the latter of which had been pivotal to Gardner's victory in 2014. Gardner did well in the typically red El Paso County, home of Colorado Springs. Gardner also did well in many rural areas of the state. However, Hickenlooper's strong performance in heavily populated counties proved too much for Gardner to overcome. Hickenlooper was also likely helped by Joe Biden, who won the state by 13.5%.

Hickenlooper is the first senator from Colorado who was also the Governor of Colorado since Senator Edwin Johnson was elected in 1936. Hickenlooper was sworn in as Senator on January 3, 2021, for a six-year term that expires on January 3, 2027.

Counties that flipped from Republican to Democratic
 Chaffee (largest municipality: Salida)
 Larimer (largest municipality: Fort Collins)

Counties that flipped from Democratic to Republican
 Alamosa (largest municipality: Alamosa)
 Huerfano (largest municipality: Walsenburg)

See also
 2020 Colorado elections
 2020 United States Senate elections

Notes
Partisan clients

Voter samples

References

Further reading

External links
Official campaign websites
 Raymon Doane (L) for Senate
 Stephan "Chairman Seku" Evans (U) for Senate
 Cory Gardner (R) for Senate
 John Hickenlooper (D) for Senate
 Danny Skelly (I write-in) for Senate

2020
Colorado
United States Senate
John Hickenlooper